Live in New York City is a live album by Dave Matthews Band recorded on July 17, 2010 at Citi Field in Queens.  The album was recorded on the second night of a two night stint at the venue.  Released on two CDs, the show contains a mix of new surprises and older fan favorites.

CD track listing

Disc one
"The Stone" (Dave Matthews) –  
"Warehouse" (Matthews) –  
"One Sweet World" (Matthews) –  
"Funny the Way It Is" (Carter Beauford/Stefan Lessard/Matthews/LeRoi Moore/Rashawn Ross/Boyd Tinsley) –  
"Seek Up" (Matthews) –  
"Seven" (Beauford/Lessard/Matthews/Moore/Ross/Tinsley) –  
"Squirm" (Beauford/Matthews) –  
"Crash into Me" (Matthews) –  
"You Might Die Trying" (Dave Matthews Band/Mark Batson) –

Disc two
"Proudest Monkey" (Dave Matthews Band) –  
"Satellite" (Matthews) –  
"Spaceman" (Beauford/Lessard/Matthews) –  
"Dancing Nancies" (Matthews) –  
"Gravedigger" (Matthews) –  
"Blackjack" (Beauford/Lessard/Matthews/Moore/Ross/Tinsley) –  
"Stay (Wasting Time)" (Lessard/Matthews/Moore) –  
"Two Step" (Matthews) –  
"Some Devil" (Matthews) –  
"Shake Me Like a Monkey" (Beauford/Lessard/Matthews/Moore/Ross/Tinsley) –  
"Bass Solo" (Stefan Lessard) –  
"All Along the Watchtower" (Bob Dylan) –

Big Apple Bonus Disc
"Why I Am"
"Grey Street"
"Big Eyed Fish...>"
"Pantala Naga Pampa" ...> "Rapunzel"
"#41 "
"Little Red Bird"
"Time Bomb...>"
"So Damn Lucky"

Personnel
Dave Matthews Band
Dave Matthews - guitars, lead vocals
Boyd Tinsley - violins, backing vocals
Stefan Lessard - bass
Carter Beauford - drums, percussion, backing vocals
With Guests
Jeff Coffin - saxophones
Tim Reynolds - electric guitars
Rashawn Ross - trumpet, backing vocals

Chart performance

References 

Dave Matthews Band live albums
2010 live albums
RCA Records live albums